Cairo High School is a public high school in Cairo, Georgia. United States.  The school's motto is "With Pride, We Give Our Best."  Cairo High School was recognized as the SAT Region Winner for Class AAA and Region 1-AAA for 2005 and 2006.  CHS students showed three-year average gains in reading and math SAT scores.

History
Cairo (pronounced "kay-row" instead of "ki-row" like the Egyptian city) is nicknamed the "syrup city" because Roddenbery's syrup plant was formerly located in Cairo. The syrup made in Cairo is cooked from sugar cane juice and is not the corn syrup known as Karo syrup, although the names are pronounced the same.  During a driving rainstorm in the middle of a football game many years ago, workers at the local syrup shelter brought over their rain coats labeled "Roddenbery's Syrup" on the backs of the jackets to keep the players dry.  Reflecting this heritage, the Cairo High School football team was named the Cairo Syrupmakers. In 1986 ESPN named "Syrupmaker" the number one nickname for a high school sports team.

The school mascot is depicted as a syrup pitcher. In 1994, Amy Gerleman created the team's first syrup pitcher mascot costume and began wearing the "pitcher" to pep rallies and football games.  The term is often shortened to "Maids" for the girls or "Makers" for the boys.

Athletics
Boys' sports
Basketball - junior varsity and varsity
Baseball - JV and varsity
Cross country
Football - JV and varsity
Golf
Soccer - JV and varsity
Track
Tennis
Wrestling
Girls' sports
Basketball - JV and varsity
Cross Country
Golf
Mat Girls (wrestling)
Soccer - JV and varsity
Softball - JV and varsity
Track
Tennis

The 2008 Football Syrupmakers are Class AAA State Champions after the school's second undefeated season (1990 was the other).

Concert and Marching Band
The Cairo High School band was first established in September 1946 and the first director was William "Major" T. Verran. Major conducted the band from its inception until 1972.  The marching band first took the field in 1947 during a football game.

After the retirement of Major, the band was under the direction of Joe David III.  Mr. David held the baton from 1972 until 1982, and again from 1986 until his retirement in 1996.  Mr. David was an inductee into the Georgia Bandmaster's Hall of Fame and also awarded the GMEA Distinguished Career Award.  A music scholarship was established after his death to aid members of the band in a pursuit of a music major in college.  The award is $1000 and awarded annually.

The band was briefly under the direction of Joe Doyle from 1983 - 1985.

The band is referred to as "The Pride of Dixie" and currently under the direction of John E. Scanling and Adam L. Swan.

Activities and clubs
Academic Club
Art
Cairo High School Marching Band
Co Ed Y
Dance
Debate
FBLA
FCCLA
FFA - Future Farmers of America
French Club
History
Interact Club
Key Club
Latin Club
Library Club
National Honor Society
Navy Junior ROTC
Outdoors
SADD
SAGE
Science Club
SkillsUSA
Spanish Club
Student Council
Technology
Theatre

Traditions

Alma Mater written by Reba Spears
We salute thee Alma Mater
Thou to us art dear
May thy virtues and thy teachings
Guide us every year.
Cairo High in future years
Our memories will turn back
To the days of Cairo High School
To the Red and Black.

Expansion
A $3 million construction project for a new career academy at Cairo High School is being constructed.  The school was one of three centers in the state chosen to receive the $3 million grant.  Career Technical and Agriculture Education courses will cater to a variety of career paths like nursing, graphics and design. The academy will also offer a new course called mechatronics.

Notable alumni

 Teresa Edwards, former professional basketball player; Olympic gold medalist
 Cliff Hammonds, professional basketball player
 Willie Harris, member of the 2005 World Champion Chicago White Sox; member of the Cincinnati Reds
 David Ponder, former NFL defensive tackle
 Daryle Singletary, country music singer
 Bill Stanfill, former All-Pro National Football League defensive end
 Gordon Thomas, British secret intelligence author and journalist
 Mickey Thomas, lead singer for rock band Starship
 Bobby Walden, member of the Georgia Sports Hall of Fame; punter, kick returner, and halfback for the University of Georgia from 1958 to 1960; played with the Minnesota Vikings and Pittsburgh Steelers starting punter for the Super Bowl IX and X champion teams; nicknamed "The Big Toe from Cairo"
 J.J. Wilcox, professional football player drafted 2013 by Dallas Cowboys (2013-current); safety

References

External links
Cairo High School website
Grady County School System

Public high schools in Georgia (U.S. state)
Schools in Grady County, Georgia